The 1954 Philadelphia Eagles season was their 22nd in the league. They matched their previous output of 7–4–1. The team failed to qualify for the playoffs for the fifth consecutive season. This was the first season to feature the Eagle wings logo on the helmets.

Off Season 
Philadelphia finished second in the last 2 seasons to the Cleveland Browns, with that Trimble is awarded a three-year contract after the team's second straight runner-up finish in 1953.

The Eagles hold training camp in Hershey, PA again. The 1954 season was the first in which the Eagles used the "wings" logo on their helmets.

NFL DRAFT 
The 1954 NFL Draft was held on January 28, 1954. The draft is again 30 rounds long, with 12 teams picking. A total of 360 players are taken in this 1 day draft. In 2011, a total of 254 players were taken by 32 teams over 3 nights.

The Eagles chose 28 players in this year's draft.

Player selections 
The table shows the Eagle's selections and what picks they had that were traded away and the team that ended up with that pick. It is possible the Eagles' pick ended up with this team via another team that the Eagles made a trade with.
Not shown are acquired picks that the Eagles traded away.

Schedule

Standings

Roster 
(All time List of Philadelphia Eagles players in franchise history)

 + = Was a Starter in the Pro-Bowl

References 

Philadelphia Eagles seasons
Philadelphia Eagles
Philly